Occasional Wife is an American sitcom which aired on NBC beginning September 13, 1966 and running until May 9, 1967 (repeats were aired through August 29). It was originally on NBC's Tuesday night schedule, airing from 8:30–9:00PM ET/PT. Reruns were aired on Comedy Central in 1992.

Synopsis
The lead character was Peter Christopher, a bachelor who enjoyed the single life, but was blocked from professional advancement by not having a wife. Peter's boss, baby-food manufacturer Max Brahms, was, because of his product, a strong believer in marriage and family. Christopher asked a young hat check girl, Greta Patterson, to pose as his wife at company functions. In return, Peter set up Greta in an apartment two floors above his own in a Manhattan building. Greta would use the fire escape to slip into Peter's 7th floor apartment from her apartment on the 9th floor whenever his boss would drop by unexpectedly.  As a silent running gag, Bryan O'Byrne played the "Man in the middle" who bemusedly watched the comings and goings of the two from his 8th floor vantage point. The sitcom's uncredited narrator was the well-known sports announcer Vin Scully.

The series first experienced good ratings, tying at #18 with The Man from U.N.C.L.E. in the Nielsen ratings. The series then fell to #64 in the ratings after having to compete against ABC's popular series The Invaders and the CBS staple The Red Skelton Show. Occasional Wife was canceled after one season.

The series was also notable for being one of the first sitcoms to eliminate the use of the laugh track, which set the series apart from other sitcoms on at the time. Its practice of not using canned laughter has now become an industry standard with most modern day single camera sitcoms.

It is also noteworthy that in 1967 the lead actor, Michael Callan, divorced his wife and married Patricia Harty, his costar on this series.

Cast
 Michael Callan as Peter Christopher
 Patricia Harty as Greta Patterson
 Jack Collins as Max Brahms
 Stuart Margolin as Bernie Kramer
 Chris Noel as Marilyn
 Bryan O'Byrne as Man-in-the-Middle
 Jack Riley as Wally Frick
 Sara Seegar as Mrs. Christopher (Peter's mother)
 Susan Silo as Vera Frick
 Joan Tompkins as Mrs. Brahms (two episodes)

Episodes

Footnotes

References
 Brooks, T. & Marsh, E. (1979). The Complete Directory To Primetime Network TV Shows. New York: Ballantine Books, pp. 454–455
 Brooks, T. (1987). The Complete Directory To Primetime TV Stars. New York: Ballantine Books, p. 141
 Tucker, D. C. (2010). Lost Laughs of '50s and '60s Television: Thirty Sitcoms That Faded Off Screen. Jefferson, N.C.: McFarland, pp. 171–177

External links
 

1966 American television series debuts
1967 American television series endings
1960s American sitcoms
NBC original programming
Television series by Screen Gems
English-language television shows
Television shows set in New York City